The following list is all the known recordings by The Mad Capsule Markets

Albums

Compilations and live albums

Singles and EPs
Happy Ride UK 2005/02/28 
Scary Single UK 2004/11/01 
Scary 7" UK 2004/11/01 
Scary Single 2004/02/04 
Gaga Life UK Single 2003/07/07, UK 
Fly High UK Single 2003/03/31, UK 
Fly High 7" Single 2003/03/18, Holland 
All the Time in Sunny Beach 7" UK 2002/11/04 
All the Time in Sunny Beach 7" Single 2002/09/16 
Tribe UK Promo 2002/05/?? 
Tribe UK Single 2002/05/20, UK 
Fly High Single 2002/01/23 
Pulse UK Single 2001/12/03, UK 
Pulse EP US Promo 2001/07/??, US 
Pulse US Promo 2001/07/??, US 
Gaga Life Single 2001/06/13 
Chaos Step Single 2001/05/23 
Good Girl Single 2000/01/21 
Pulse Single 1999/07/28 
Midi Surf Single 1998/08/28 
Creature Single 1997/11/21 
Crash Pow Single 1997/11/21 
Crash Pow / Creature Split Vinyl 1997/11/21 
CMJ Promo 1997/10/??, US 
Systematic Single 1997/08/21 
Walk Single 1996/03/23 
Kami Uta Single 1995/12/06 
Eject→Out Single 1994/06/22 
Karakuri no Soko Single 1991/08/21 
Ayatsuri Ningyo Single 1991/08/21 
Gichi Single 1991/08/21 
Government Wall Single 1990/08/01 
Poison Revolution Demo 198? (Released while the band was still known as Berrie)

Videos
Gichi Video 1991/08/21
Reading S.S.M. video 1994/06/22
MCM Video 1995/03/24
4 Plugs Video 1996/08/07
Osc Dis Video 2001/01/21
Pulse US DVD Promo 2001/08/??, US
Osc-Dis US DVD 2001/10/30, US
Pulse UK DVD 2001/12/03, UK
Osc Dis DVD 2002/01/23
020120 DVD 2002/10/26
1990-1996 DVD 2005/03/16
1997-2004 DVD 2005/03/16

References
Crazy Pill Bazaar's TMCM Album Discography
Crazy Pill Bazaar's TMCM Single Discography
Crazy Pill Bazaar's TMCM Video Discography

Discographies of Japanese artists
Rock music group discographies